Jeolgu and gongi are a type of traditional Korean mortar and pestle set, used for pounding grains or tteok (rice cake). They can be made with timber, stone, or iron. Jeolgu is a bowl-shaped vessel in which grains or tteok can be pounded, and gongi refers to either a pestle for a mortar or a stamper for a stamp mill.

Gallery

See also 
 Usu, Japanese equivalent of jeolgu

References 

Korean words and phrases
Food grinding tools
Korean food preparation utensils